is a passenger railway station  located in the city of Yonago, Tottori Prefecture, Japan. It is operated by the West Japan Railway Company (JR West).

Lines

Station layout
The station consists of one ground-level island platform connected to the station building by a level crossing. One side of the platform is for electrified trains, and the other for diesel. There is a train maintenance factory and railyard next to the station.

Platforms

Adjacent stations

History
Gotō Station opened on November 1, 1902.

Passenger statistics
In fiscal 2018, the station was used by an average of 866 passengers daily.

Surrounding area
Tottori Prefectural Route 245 Ryosanyanagi Goto Station Line

See also
List of railway stations in Japan

References

External links 

  Gotō Station from JR-Odekake.net 

Railway stations in Japan opened in 1902
Railway stations in Tottori Prefecture
Stations of West Japan Railway Company
Yonago, Tottori